Evin is a neighbourhood in the north of Tehran.

The district consists of an old section filled with orchards and gardens of old houses and a new section with high rises and skyscrapers.

It is adjacent to Shahid Beheshti University campus. It is notorious for the nearby Evin Prison, a detention center famous for atrocities committed against political prisoners, both in the pre-1979 period and in the post-revolutionary period.

It is minutes away from the Darakeh hiking trail. Hiking is a national pastime in Iran, and this trail thus brings many tourists to the area.

References

External links

Tehran: Up the mountains in Darakeh

Neighbourhoods in Tehran